İlyas Demir (born June 16, 1985 in Istanbul, Turkey) is a Turkish karateka competing in the kumite -60 kg division. He is a member of the İstanbul Büyükşehir Belediyesi S.K.

Achievements
2010
  Baku Open - September 14 Baku AZE - kumite -60 kg
  45th European Championships - May 7, Athens GRE - kumite -60 kg

2009
  44th European Championships - May 8, Zagreb CRO - kumite -60 kg

2007
  German Open - September 15, Aschaffenburg GER - kumite -60 kg 
  42nd European Championships - May 4, Bratislava SVK - kumite -60 kg 
  Italian Open - March 31, Monza ITA - kumite -60 kg

References

1985 births
Sportspeople from Istanbul
Living people
Turkish male karateka
Istanbul Büyükşehir Belediyespor athletes
21st-century Turkish people